Jason Beau Keep (born May 9, 1978) is a former professional basketball player who started his collegiate carrier with the Oklahoma State Cowboys and later transferred to the San Diego Torreros. He was undrafted in the 2003 NBA Draft. During his professional career, he tried out in the NBA with multiple teams such as the Indiana pacers, the San Antonio Spurs, the Houston Rockets and the Sacramento Kings. He also played overseas in the Philippines, Spain, Italy, Cyprus, Egypt, Chile, Poland, Argentina, Mexico, France and Germany. He set and still holds the NBA Draft Combine bench press record with 27 repetitions. He also played in C.D. Universidad de Concepción Básquetbol, which is a team of División Mayor del Básquetbol de Chile. Through his carrier he was awarded multiple awards including the MVP of the West Coast Conference tournament. He now works as a successful tattoo artist.

Player profile
Born in Bend, Oregon, Keep played his final college season for San Diego after starting his career at North Idaho College in Coeur d'Alene, Idaho and later Oklahoma State. He sat out 2001–02 season at San Diego under NCAA transfer rules.

References

External links
Player Profile
PBA-Online! Profile
NBA Prospect Profile

1978 births
Living people
American expatriate basketball people in the Philippines
American expatriate basketball people in Turkey
American men's basketball players
Basketball players from Idaho
Basketball players from Washington (state)
Centers (basketball)
Galatasaray S.K. (men's basketball) players
Junior college men's basketball players in the United States
Oklahoma State Cowboys basketball players
People from Moscow, Idaho
Philippine Basketball Association imports
Rain or Shine Elasto Painters players
San Diego Toreros men's basketball players
Sportspeople from Bend, Oregon